This is a list of people who served as Lord Lieutenant of Perthshire. The office was replaced by the Lord Lieutenant of Perth and Kinross in 1975.

 John Murray, 4th Duke of Atholl 17 March 1794 – 29 September 1830
 Thomas Hay-Drummond, 11th Earl of Kinnoull 18 October 1830 – 18 February 1866
 George Kinnaird, 9th Lord Kinnaird 26 February 1866 – 7 January 1878
 John Stewart-Murray, 7th Duke of Atholl 9 February 1878 – 20 January 1917
 John Stewart-Murray, 8th Duke of Atholl 15 March 1917 – 15 March 1942
 Kenneth Kinnaird, 12th Lord Kinnaird 28 April 1942 – 1960
 Mungo Murray, 7th Earl of Mansfield and Mansfield 30 April 1960 – 2 September 1971
 David Henry Butter 25 November 1971 – 1975
 Butter became Lord Lieutenant of Perth and Kinross

References

Perth and Kinross
Perthshire
 
1794 establishments in Great Britain